Agustín Gamarra Messia (August 27, 1785 – November 18, 1841) was a Peruvian soldier and politician, who served as the 4th and 6th President of Peru.

Gamarra was a Mestizo, being of mixed Spanish and Quechua descent. He had a military life since childhood, battling against the royalist forces. He then joined the cause of Independence as second in command after Andrés de Santa Cruz. He also participated in the Battle of Ayacucho, and was later named Chief of State. In 1825, he married Francisca ('Pancha') Zubiaga y Bernales, who Simon Bolivar crowned when she was about to put the crown on him. After the invasion of Bolivia in 1828, he was named a mariscal (marshal), a highly esteemed military officer.

After the defeat of José de la Mar in Gran Colombia, Gamarra urged his overthrow and assumed the presidency for a brief period after Antonio Gutiérrez de la Fuente. The peace treaty with Gran Colombia was also signed during Gamarra's government.

Presidency of Peru

First Presidency
The government of Gamarra followed contrary beliefs to those of José de la Mar. This coincided with a great Peruvian constitutionalist movement; Gamarra put aside the Constitution of 1828, which he opposed given the limitations that were established for the executive branch.

Gamarra finished, with great effort, his first constitutional government. He had a very active character which allowed him to leave Lima to thwart rebellions in various parts of the country. During such expeditions he would leave the presidency to Antonio Gutiérrez de la Fuente, who manifested his authoritarian character and started to receive the enmity of other government officials based in Lima.

Peru and Bolivia: one and indivisible?
Another idea that obsessed Gamarra was the annexation of Bolivia. He shared this idea with Andrés de Santa Cruz. However, while Bolivia did not think of the creation of one single State, Gamarra believed in the incorporation of the Bolivian territory under a single Peruvian nation.

Second Presidency and invasion of Bolivia
In 1835, when Orbegoso and Andrés Santa Cruz signed the treaty to establish the Peru-Bolivian Confederacy, Gamarra deeply opposed it and participated in a campaign to defeat it with the help of Chile. This led to the Battle of Yungay and the overthrow of Santa Cruz. Gamarra was then officially named President by the Peruvian congress.

From January to October 1839 the Chilean troops of General Manuel Bulnes were stationed in Lima to stabilize Gamarra's new regime. 

During his second government, Gamarra confronted the challenge of pacifying the country in middle of various subversions while at the same time the beginning of a war against Bolivia. Gamarra was defeated and killed by Bolivian forces during the Battle of Ingavi in 1841.

Notes

References 

People from Cusco
1785 births
1841 deaths
People of the War of the Confederation
Peruvian people of Basque descent
Peruvian politicians of Quechua descent
Presidents of Peru
Marshals of Peru